was a merchant and shipper of Edo period Kyoto.

Along with the families of Chaya Shirōjirō and Gotō Shōzaburō, the Suminokura family, whose merchant enterprise Ryōi founded, represented one of the three chief merchant families in the city in this period.

Life and career
Ryōi was born into a branch family of physicians and moneylenders. Like many commoner merchants of the period, he later came to be known by a name related to his work — Suminokura, or "corner warehouse".

Ryōi obtained a formal trade license, a shuinjō, from Toyotomi Hideyoshi, and managed overseas trading operations, importing goods from southern Vietnam. After Hideyoshi's death in 1598, Ryōi became a trusted advisor and supplier to Tokugawa Ieyasu, who became shōgun in 1603, and continued his overseas operations, with a shuinjō granted by Ieyasu.

Between 1605 and 1611, he also played a major role in constructing canals and making the rivers of Kyoto more navigable, so as to better ship goods to, from, and within the city. These included the Tenryū, Takase, Fujigawa, and Hozu rivers; in exchange for his efforts, the Suminokura business was granted extended shipping rights within the city.

Ryōi's sons Suminokura Genshi and Soan followed in their father's footsteps, and took over the family business after his death, enjoying considerable prosperity until the imposition of maritime restrictions by the shogunate in the mid-1630s, when trade with Vietnam came to an end.

Notes

References
 Nussbaum, Louis-Frédéric and Käthe Roth. (2005).  Japan encyclopedia. Cambridge: Harvard University Press. ;  OCLC 58053128
 Sansom, George (1963). "A History of Japan: 1615–1867". Stanford, California: Stanford University Press. ; 

1554 births
1614 deaths
16th-century Japanese businesspeople
17th-century Japanese businesspeople